Crazy Over Horses is a 1951 comedy film starring The Bowery Boys. The film was released on November 18, 1951 by Monogram Pictures and is the twenty-fourth film in the series.

Plot
Louie is owed money by a stable-owner and sends Slip and the boys over to collect the debt.  They return with a horse, My Girl, as payment.  Local gangsters want the horse and switch their horse, Tarzana, for the gang's horse.  They boys discover the ruse and the horses are switched several more times.

After the boys finally procure the real My Girl,  Sach races her against Tarzana (the gangster's horse) and several others, ending with a photo finish in which My Girl beats Tarzana by a tongue. The gangsters quickly try to leave town before their boss finds them.

Cast

The Bowery Boys
Leo Gorcey as Terrance Aloysius 'Slip' Mahoney
Huntz Hall as Horace Debussy 'Sach' Jones
William Benedict as Whitey
David Gorcey as Chuck (Credited as David Condon)
Bennie Bartlett as Butch

Remaining cast
Bernard Gorcey as Louie Dumbrowski
Gloria Saunders as Terry Flynn
Ted de Corsia as Duke
Tim Ryan as Mr. Flynn
Allen Jenkins as "Weepin' Willie"

Production
This was the first film that David Gorcey was credited under using his mother's maiden name, Condon.  It is also the return of Bennie Bartlett to the gang.

This was also the last appearance of William Benedict in the series. Benedict's reason for leaving the series was that "I suddenly decided I had enough, and it was getting a little rough doing 'em - emotionally. There was a lot of infighting going on and I said, 'I don't need this'".

Home media
Warner Archives released the film on made-to-order DVD in the United States as part of "The Bowery Boys, Volume One" on November 23, 2012.

References

External links

1951 comedy films
1951 films
American black-and-white films
Bowery Boys films
Monogram Pictures films
Films about horses
Films directed by William Beaudine
American comedy films
1950s English-language films
1950s American films